Ermengarde of Anjou, ( - ), was the Countess of Rennes, Regent of Brittany (992–994) and also Countess of Angoulême.

Life
Ermengarde-Gerberga was born , the daughter of Geoffrey I, Count of Anjou and Adele of Meaux. She married Conan I of Rennes, Count of Rennes, in 973. Her husband Conan of Rennes opposed her father and brother Fulk even though the marriage was apparently designed to form a political alliance between Anjou and Brittany. Even after Conan had been killed by Fulk at the Battle of Conquereuil in 992, and during the period 992-994 when Ermengarde was Regent for their son Geoffrey, she remained loyal to her brother Fulk III, Count of Anjou. In 992, following the interests of her brother, and functioning as Regent, she accepted Capetian over-lordship for Rennes while rejecting that of Odo I, Count of Blois.

About 1000 her brother Fulk III arranged his widowed sister to marry, secondly, William II of Angoulême, one of his close allies.

Issue
Ermengarde married Conan I 'le Tort' Count of Rennes, she had the following children:

Judith (982–1017), married Richard II, Duke of Normandy.
Geoffrey I, Duke of Brittany, the eventual heir to Conan I.
Judicael, count of Porhoët (died 1037).
Hernod.

William II 'Taillefer' Count of Angoulême, married her sister Gerberga and had the following children:

 Alduin, Count of Angoulême (d. 1032), married Alaisia de Gasçogne.
 Geoffrey, Count of Angoulême (d.1048), married 1st Petronille d'Archiac, 2nd Anceline.
 Fulk of Angoulême, married Aynors.
 Odon (flourished c. 1030).
 Arnauld (died young).
 William (died young).

Notes

References

|-

Duchesses of Brittany
House of Ingelger
10th-century Breton people
10th-century French women
11th-century Breton people
11th-century French women
10th-century women rulers
950s births
1020s deaths
Year of birth uncertain
Year of death uncertain